CMJ was a music events/online media company which hosted an annual festival in New York City

CMJ may also refer to:
 Central Motorway Junction, motorway interchange in Auckland, New Zealand
 Christopher Martin-Jenkins (1945–2013), English cricket journalist and broadcaster
 Church's Ministry Among Jewish People, an Anglican church organisation
 CMJ University, Chandra Mohan Jha University, India
 College Mathematics Journal, a journal of the Mathematical Association of America
 Computer Music Journal, quarterly academic journal covering digital audio signal processing and electroacoustic music
 Qimei Airport (IATA airport code), Cimei, Penghu, Taiwan
 CMJ ammo, full metal jacket ammunition with cupronickel jacket